The Chawk Mosque (also Chawk Masjid) is a mosque in the city of Murshidabad, India. It was founded in 1767 AD by Munny Begum, wife of Nawab Mir Zafar. Earlier in this place  Nawab Murshid Quli Khan  had built the "Chahel Sutan", which was the city's forty pillared audience hall. The mosque still recalls the stories of the ruling days of the Nawabs and still holds on its glory of the past.

Construction
The Masjid was founded by Munny Begum,  the wife of Nawab Mir Zafar in 1767 AD under the supervision of Shaikh Khalilallah . Earlier on this venue Nawab Murshid Quli Khan built the "Chahel Sutan", which was the city's forty pillared audience hall. The mosque still recalls the stories of the ruling days of the Nawabs and still holds on its glory of the past. The mosque is located in the Nizamat Fort Area near the Hazarduari Palace and its other nearby buildings.

This mosque was of great importance in the Nawabi era as Munny Begum was  a favourite of Robert Clive and Warren Hastings in terms of her lavish distribution. She in turn received several gifts; one was a palanquin which could accommodate 30 people from Rani Bhavani. Munny Begum had her allowances separately assigned. Thus, she was a Gaddinashin Begum. There have been several other Begums who have been a Gaddinashin Begum, like Babbu Begum another wife of Nawab Mir Zafar, she was on a receipt of 8000 per month while Munny Begum received  12000. There have been more such Gaddinashin Begums. Munny Begum had done several acts of munificence to the East India Company and their servants. On her death a salute was fired by the Government corresponding to the number of years of her age as she was always viewed with cordial regard and has a distinguished consideration to the Government of the East India Company. 

So, the mosque was of utmost importance then under the rule of the Nawabs.

Etymology
The Masjid (mosque) has been named so as it has a Chawk still surrounding it. Chawk means a shopping place often square in shape. So Chawk- means shopping place or a market and Masjid- means mosque. Thus, the total sums up to a mosque in a market. This market is the principal market of the city of Murshidabad.

Features
This mosque has a majestic and grand appearance. It is a five domed mosque and has two chau-chala-end-vaults at the two corners at the side of the mosque. The exterior and the interior of the mosque both are decorated with motifs, panels and so on; this mosque has been ornamented with such arched shaped niches in stucco and vegetal motifs lavishly. Five gates passing through arched gateways lead in front of this grand mosque. There are several shops around so this place is known as the "Chawk" (shopping place or market, square in shape). This market is the principal market of the city of Murshidabad.

Festivals
Earlier this mosque usually used to remain closed throughout the year. But nowadays, daily 5-time prayers are led by the Imam of the Masjid and a large number of people attend the daily obligatory prayers. For prominent occasions like Eid al-Adha, Eid ul-Fitr, Eid al-Ghadir the mosque is decorated and whitewashed to welcome the people of the town. Earlier a single gun was fired from the Hazarduari Palace and several other guns were fired from several other places - one was fired from here - to proclaim the different intervals of the hours for the meals and prayers during the great fast of Ramzan.

Map

Chawk Masjid picture gallery

See also
 Baro Shona Masjid
 Hazarduari Palace
 Nizamat Imambara

External links

Mosques in Murshidabad
Tourist attractions in Murshidabad
1767 establishments in India